Loboda is a surname derived from the Slavic word for plants of the genus Atriplex. It may refer to:

 Alla Loboda (born 1998), Russian ice dancer
 Dorota Łoboda (born 1975), Polish activist
 Hryhory Loboda (? - 1596), Hetman of the Ukrainian Cossacks
 Kinga Łoboda (born 1996), Polish sailor
 Peter G. Loboda, Ukrainian numismatist
 Svetlana Loboda (born 1982), Ukrainian singer and composer
 Zygmunt Łoboda (1895–1945), Polish architect

See also
 

Ukrainian words and phrases
Ukrainian-language surnames